Die Liga – Fußballverband e.V. (sometimes stylised as DIE LIGA – Fußballverband e.V.), or simply Die Liga – Fußballverband ("The League – Football Association"), and often shortened to Ligaverband ("League Association"), is the parent company of the Deutsche Fußball Liga. The Ligaverband is an association of the 36 German professional football clubs (or their companies) that partake in the Bundesliga and 2. Bundesliga, which represents their interests, especially against the German Football Association (Deutscher Fußball-Bund, DFB).

Function
On 30 September 2000, at the extraordinary congress of the DFB-Bundestag in Mainz, the 36 professional clubs were released into the independence they had been demanding for many years. The Ligaverband was founded on 18 December 2000 as an Eingetragener Verein, with the DFB allowing the use of the two professional leagues in which the 36 professional clubs played in. In order to fulfill its duties, the Ligaverband established the Deutsche Fußball Liga (DFL) as a subsidiary, and transferred their operations to it. Several documents define the cooperation of the DFB and the Ligaverband:

 Constitution of the DFB
 Constitution of the Ligaverband
 Basic contract between the DFB and the Ligaverband

Since 28 April 2001, the Ligaverband has been the representative association of clubs of the Bundesliga and 2. Bundesliga. Those clubs are members of the Ligaverband and indirectly of the German Football Association through their respective state associations. The Ligaverband is a member of the DFB, though. Since the start of the 2001–02 season, the Ligaverband has been responsible for operating the top two German professional leagues.

Basic contract
Since the DFB and Ligaverband organise the Bundesliga competitions jointly, a basic contract has been in place since the beginning of the 2004–05 season, which determines the rights and obligations of both parties. In particular, it grants the Ligaverband the right to organize the DFB-owned club competitions of the Bundesliga and 2. Bundesliga. It also gives the Ligaverband full marketing rights to the leagues. Not addressed in the basic contract are the competitions that can be autonomously controlled by the Ligaverband (such as the DFL-Ligapokal and the former DFB-Hallenpokal).

In addition, the basic contract includes specific requirements regarding kick-off times and transmission of matches on free-to-air television. The basic contract was terminated for the first time by the DFB as well as the Ligaverband in 2012.

Bodies
The Ligaverband is managed by the board, which currently is composed of the president, two vice-presidents, and six other members, elected for three-year terms. The president of the Ligaverband is a member of the Presidium and Vorstand of the German Football Association.

Werner Hackmann, from the Vorstand of Hamburger SV, was the first president of the Ligaverband until his death in January 2007. Wolfgang Holzhäuser of Bayer Leverkusen held the office provisionally until Reinhard Rauball was elected as the next president in August 2007 at the general assembly. Christian Seifert became the president of the Vorstand of the Ligaverband from 2019 to 2021, succeeded by Donata Hopfen who served from 1 January until 7 December 2022.

See also
 German Football Association
 Deutsche Fußball Liga

References

External links
Statutes of the Ligaverband 
Base contract between the DFB and the Ligaverband 

 
1